Glenn Claes may refer to:

Glenn Claes (born 1994), Belgian football player 
Glenn Claes (singer), Belgian singer and winner of season 1 of The Voice van Vlaanderen